"Kick in the Eye" is a song by English gothic rock band Bauhaus. It was released in 1981 as one of two singles released along their second studio album, Mask (1981) and was released the following year as an EP titled Kick in the Eye (Searching for Satori E.P.).

Release 

"Kick in the Eye" was released on 27 March 1981 as a single from the band's second studio album, Mask (1981). It reached number 59 in the UK Singles Chart.

"Kick in the Eye" was rereleased in February 1982 in EP form, titled Kick in the Eye (Searching for Satori E.P.). This version contains an audibly different mix, where the guitar is significantly louder. The EP reached number 45 in the same chart.

Track listing 

All tracks written by Bauhaus.

 7" single
 "Kick in the Eye"
 "Satori"

Kick in the Eye (Searching for Satori E.P.)

 7"
 "Kick in the Eye (Searching for Satori)" – 3:31
 "Harry" – 2:39
 "Earwax" – 3:13

 12"
 "Kick in the Eye (Searching for Satori)" – 3:31
 "In Fear of Dub" – 2:52
 "Harry" – 2:39
 "Earwax" – 3:13

Note: A rare misprint of the 12" exists, including "Poison Pen" instead of "In Fear Of Dub". This rare 12" is only identifiable via listening, as the sleeve and vinyl are identical to the normal version.

Personnel 
 Bauhaus

 David J – bass guitar, backing vocals, production
 Kevin Haskins – drums, percussion, production
 Daniel Ash – guitar, backing vocals, production
 Peter Murphy – lead vocals, production

References

External links 

 
 

Bauhaus (band) songs
1981 singles
1981 songs
Beggars Banquet Records singles
Songs written by Daniel Ash